Back to the Heavyweight Jam is the sixth studio album by German band Scooter, released on 27 September 1999. It contains two singles, "Faster Harder Scooter" and "Fuck the Millennium".

After the single release of "F**k the Millennium" the album was re-released in December 1999 in limited edition with bonus tracks.

The album title is borrowed from a repeated line in one of the versions of the KLF song "Last Train to Trancentral".

Track listing
All songs written and composed by H.P. Baxxter, Rick J. Jordan, Axel Coon, and Jens Thele. All lyrics written by The Radical MC H.P.

"Keyser Soze" – 1:12
"Watch Out" – 4:15
"Faster Harder Scooter" – 3:46
"Well Done, Peter" – 3:53
"Fuck the Millennium" – 4:28
"The Revolution" – 4:05
"Psycho" – 5:05
"The Learning Process" – 4:55
"I'll Put You on the Guest List" – 5:11
"Main Floor" – 5:35
"Kashmir" – 4:44
"No Release" – 6:16

Strictly Limited Fuck the Millennium Edition:
"Fuck the Millennium (Single Version)"
"Dutch Christmas"
"Waiting for the Spring / Let Me Be Your Valentine (Live)"
"The Age of Love (Live)"
"No Fate (Live)"
Notes
"Keyser Soze" samples the alien-contacting theme from the 1977 film Close Encounters of the Third Kind, also known as the noise programmed to unlock a door in the 1979 James Bond film Moonraker. When played backwards, the track contains the line "Use your dildo"
"Faster Harder Scooter" samples the 1995 songs "Come On" by Axis and "The Sound of E" by Ultra Shock.
"Well Done, Peter" samples the 1999 song "Embargo!" by Embargo.
"Fuck The Millennium" samples "The Passion" by Technohead. The title of the track comes from a song by the same name by The KLF, released in 1997 under the pseudonym 2K. Likewise, "Back to the Heavyweight JAMs" is a refrain from The KLF's work. The version of the song released as a single contains a melody from Norman Petty song "Wheels", first recorded by The String-a-longs in 1961.
"The Revolution" samples the 1999 song "Who Do I Care" by Hermen.
"The Learning Process" samples the 1995 song "Technocat" by Tom Wilson.
"Main Floor" samples the song "Madagascar" by Art of Trance, taken from the 1999 album Voice of Earth.
"Kashmir" samples the song "Living on the Ceiling" by the British synth-pop band Blancmange, taken from the 1982 album Happy Families and "Turkish Bazar" by Emmanuel Top.

Charts

Certifications

References

1999 albums
Scooter (band) albums
Edel AG albums